Epicus Doomicus Metallicus is the debut album of the Swedish doom metal band Candlemass.  It was released June 10, 1986 on Black Dragon Records. On its release, the album had a significantly different sound than other European heavy metal bands of the time, because of their use of operatic vocals mixed over slow and heavy guitar riffs.  The album did not sell well on its initial release, which led to the group being dropped from the label during the same year.  Since then, the album has been re-issued in several different formats.  The album title Epicus Doomicus Metallicus is a dog latin translation rendering of Epic Doom Metal — the genre which the band helped pioneer and with which it is most commonly identified. Although he was actually a guest musician at the time of its recording, this was the only Candlemass album to feature vocalist Johan Längqvist until he joined the band, officially, in 2018.

Production
In 1985, the members of Candlemass began writing the songs "Under the Oak", "Crystal Ball", "Demons Gate" and "Dark Reflections" in Upplands Väsby. In November 1985, the group recorded a demo album at O.A.L Studios, which featured the songs "Demons Gate" and "Black Stone Wielder". The band did not have a regular lead singer at the time and Leif Edling performed vocals for the demo. The group sent the demo to Black Dragon Records in Paris, France, who offered Candlemass a one-record deal with a budget of $1,800.

In February 1986, Epicus Doomicus Metallicus was recorded at Thunderload Studios in Stockholm, Sweden, with producer Ragne Wahlquist from the metal band Heavy Load. Still without a regular vocalist, Johan Längqvist performed the vocals despite not hearing any of the music the band had performed beforehand.

Musical style
Epicus Doomicus Metallicus''' differs from other European metal bands who were known for "playing at breakneck speeds and screaming in a high-pitched frenzy". Candlemass' album features slower riffs and vocals delivered in a "baritone, operatic style".  The opening song "Solitude" features lyrics revolving around themes of suicide and depression.

ReleaseEpicus Doomicus Metallicus was released on June 10, 1986 on vinyl and CD. The band was dropped from Black Dragon Records due to disappointing album sales. Candlemass followed up the album with Nightfall (1987), after being signed to Axis Records.

The album has been re-issued in several formats. These include a re-issue by Powerline Records in 2002 that included a bonus disc of a live performance recorded in Birmingham in 1988. In 2011, the album was re-issued by Peaceville Records with an expanded booklet and the same bonus disc.

Reception

Upon release, Epicus Doomicus Metallicus'' was met with universal critical acclaim, and since its release it has been looked upon as a cornerstone of doom metal. Eduardo Rivadavia of the online music database AllMusic referred to the album as "a pillar of classic '80s metal" offering "the strongest, most consistent songwriting of the band's career", although it "was let down by vocalist Johan Längqvist, whose performance failed to deliver with the power and command of his immediate successor Messiah Marcolin." Canadian reviewer Martin Popoff lauded the "new expression of doom as black as Black Sabbath" and the executions and mix of the six tracks of the album, but found them "too manic depressive too uniformly".

Track listings

All songs written by Leif Edling except where noted.

Personnel
Candlemass
 Leif Edling – bass
 Mats Björkman – rhythm guitar
 Matz Ekström – drums

Guest musicians
 Johan Längqvist – vocals
 Klas Bergwall – lead guitar
 Christian Weberyd – guitar
 Cille Svenson – female backing vocals on "A Sorcerer's Pledge"

Production
 Ragne Wahlquist – engineer, producer
 Candlemass – artwork, cover art concept, producer
 Ulf Magnusson – photography

Bonus CD personnel
 Messiah Marcolin — vocals
 Mats Björkman — guitar
 Lars Johansson — lead guitar
 Leif Edling — bass guitar
 Jan Lindh — drums

See also

 Swedish popular music

References

External links
 

1986 debut albums
Candlemass (band) albums